Macrobrochis hampsoni is a moth of the subfamily Arctiinae. It was described by Schaus in 1924. It is found in Sichuan, China.

References

Lithosiina
Moths described in 1924